The Eta variant is a variant of SARS-CoV-2, the virus that causes COVID-19.
The Eta variant or lineage B.1.525, also called VUI-21FEB-03 (previously VUI-202102/03) by Public Health England (PHE) and formerly known as UK1188, 21D or 20A/S:484K, does not carry the same N501Y mutation found in Alpha, Beta and Gamma, but carries the same E484K-mutation as found in the Gamma, Zeta, and Beta variants, and also carries the same ΔH69/ΔV70 deletion (a deletion of the amino acids histidine and valine in positions 69 and 70) as found in Alpha, N439K variant (B.1.141 and B.1.258) and Y453F variant (Cluster 5).

Eta differs from all other variants by having both the E484K-mutation and a new F888L mutation (a substitution of phenylalanine (F) with leucine (L) in the S2 domain of the spike protein). As of 5 March 2021, it had been detected in 23 countries. It has also been reported in Mayotte, the overseas department/region of France. The first cases were detected in December 2020 in the UK and Nigeria, and as of 15 February, it had occurred in the highest frequency among samples in the latter country. As of 24 February, 56 cases were found in the UK. Denmark, which sequences all its COVID-19 cases, found 113 cases of this variant from January 14 to February 21, of which seven were directly related to foreign travels to Nigeria.

UK experts are studying it to understand how much of a risk it could be. It is currently regarded as a "variant under investigation", but pending further study, it may become a "variant of concern". Prof Ravi Gupta, from the University of Cambridge spoke to the BBC and said lineage B.1.525 appeared to have "significant mutations" already seen in some of the other newer variants, which is partly reassuring as their likely effect is to some extent more predictable.

Under the simplified naming scheme proposed by the World Health Organization, lineage B.1.525 has been labelled variant Eta.

Statistics

See also 

 Variants of SARS-CoV-2: Alpha, Beta, Gamma, Delta, Epsilon, Zeta, Theta, Iota, Kappa, Lambda, Mu, Omicron

References 

COVID-19 pandemic in Nigeria
S7